Benton Cheung Yan-lung, CBE, OStJ, JP (18 April 1922 – 19 September 2021) was a Hong Kong businessman and politician with New Territories rural background. He was a member of the Legislative Council of Hong Kong from 1981 to 1991 and chairman of the Regional Council of Hong Kong and New Territories Heung Yee Kuk.

Biography
Cheung was born on 18 April 1922 in a New Territories village in the North District nearby the Hong Kong–China border to his father Cheung Chi-hang and his wife Choi Siu-tai. Having graduated from the La Salle College and with a degree in economics from the University of Dr. Sun Yat-sen in Canton, Cheung worked in his father's business in Hong Kong.

In 1964, he was selected by the rural committees as the 16th chairman of the Heung Yee Kuk, representing the indigenous inhabitants. He was also chairman of the North District Community Centre and Town Hall Management Committee.

Cheung was appointed to the Legislative Council of Hong Kong in 1981. In 1985, he became the chairman of the Regional Council (Provisional Regional Council up to 1986) which he held the position until 1995. He was also member of the North District Board. He held other public positions including member of North District Social Services Committee, St. John Council, Hong Kong Housing Authority and Fireworks Displays Vetting Committee. He was also director of the Hong Kong Future Exchange and Kowloon-Canton Railway Corporation.

He had three wives, the first being Angela Liu Fung-wo, while the second was Dolly Chan Shuk-ching, and the third was Hui Yuk-kau, with them he had 16 children. His ninth son, Alexander Fu (birth name Cheung Fu-sheng) was a famous kungfu movie star.

Cheung died on 19 September 2021, at the age of 99.

References

1922 births
2021 deaths
Members of the Regional Council of Hong Kong
District councillors of North District
Heung Yee Kuk
Indigenous inhabitants of the New Territories in Hong Kong
Progressive Hong Kong Society politicians
HK LegCo Members 1985–1988
HK LegCo Members 1988–1991
Commanders of the Order of the British Empire
Officers of the Order of St John
Hong Kong Affairs Advisors
Members of the Selection Committee of Hong Kong